Chelyaba is a rural locality (a village) in Palnikovskoye Rural Settlement, Permsky District, Perm Krai, Russia. The population was 71 as of 2010. There are  2 streets.

Geography 
Chelyaba is located 61 km south of Perm (the district's administrative centre) by road. Byrma is the nearest rural locality.

References 

Rural localities in Permsky District